Prismatomeris is a genus of plant in the family Rubiaceae. It contains the following species, as of March 2021:
Prismatomeris albidiflora 
Prismatomeris beccariana 
Prismatomeris brachypus 
Prismatomeris filamentosa 
Prismatomeris fragrans 
Prismatomeris glabra 
Prismatomeris griffithii 
Prismatomeris javanica 
Prismatomeris khoonmengiana 
Prismatomeris kinabaluensis 
Prismatomeris memecyloides 
Prismatomeris mollis 
Prismatomeris obtusifolia 
Prismatomeris robusta 
Prismatomeris sessiliflora 
Prismatomeris tetrandra

References 

 
Rubiaceae genera
Taxonomy articles created by Polbot